The Oregon Holocaust Memorial is an outdoor memorial dedicated to victims of the Holocaust. Located in Portland, Oregon's Washington Park, the memorial was dedicated on August 29, 2004. Owned by the American Jewish Committee and constructed by Atlas Landscape Architecture and the Walsh Construction Company, the idea for a memorial was proposed in 1994 by Alice Kern and a local group of Holocaust survivors that met through the Oregon Holocaust Resource Center. According to Fodor's, the memorial is open daily from dawn to dusk and admission is free of charge.

Design
The memorial features a stone bench with wrought iron gating around a cobblestone circle. Scattered bronzes of common objects such as shoes, glasses, and a suitcase represent items left behind by those persecuted during the Holocaust. A cobblestone walkway, with granite bars simulating railroad tracks, leads to a wall containing a history of the Holocaust as well as quotes from survivors. The memorial also contains a "soil vault panel", which covers soil and ash from six extermination camps of the Holocaust (Auschwitz-Birkenau, Bełżec, Chelmno, Majdanek, Treblinka, and Sobibor) brought back by local residents. Engraved on the back of the wall are the names of people who died in the camps, as well as the names of their surviving relatives in Oregon and Southwest Washington. Author and designer John Laursen created the lettering for the memorial. Other design team members included artists Tad Savinar and Paul Sutinen, landscape architects John Warner, Marianne Zarkin and Marlene Salon, and historian Marshall Lee.

Construction
The total estimated cost of construction was $800,000, funded by grants and private donations. The primary contractor for the project was Oregon's Walsh Construction Company. Minnesota-based Coldspring Granite Company provided granite for the memorial.

History
The memorial was vandalized in 2021.

See also
 2004 in art
 List of Holocaust memorials and museums
 Oregon Korean War Memorial

References

External links

 Oregon Holocaust Resource Center
 Driving Directions to the Oregon Holocaust Memorial (PDF)
 Oregon Holocaust Memorial: 5th Anniversary Announcement (PDF)

2004 establishments in Oregon
2004 sculptures
Bronze sculptures in Oregon
Holocaust memorials
Jews and Judaism in Portland, Oregon
Monuments and memorials in Portland, Oregon
Outdoor sculptures in Portland, Oregon
Tourist attractions in Portland, Oregon
Washington Park (Portland, Oregon)
Vandalized works of art in Oregon